Collective consciousness, collective conscience,  or collective conscious is the set of shared beliefs, ideas, and moral attitudes which operate as a unifying force within society. In general, it does not refer to the specifically moral conscience,  but to a shared understanding of social norms.

The modern concept of what can be considered collective consciousness includes solidarity attitudes, memes, extreme behaviors like group-think and herd behavior, and collectively shared experiences during collective rituals and dance parties. Rather than existing as separate individuals, people come together as dynamic groups to share resources and knowledge. It has also developed as a way of describing how an entire community comes together to share similar values. This has also been termed "hive mind", "group mind", "mass mind", and "social mind".

Historical use of collective consciousness
The term was introduced by the French sociologist Émile Durkheim in his The Division of Labour in Society in 1893. The French word conscience generally means "conscience", "consciousness", "awareness", or "perception". Commentators and translators of Durkheim disagree on which is most appropriate, or whether the translation should depend on the context.  Some prefer to treat the word 'conscience' as an untranslatable foreign word or technical term, without its normal English meaning. As for "collective", Durkheim makes clear that he is not reifying or hypostasizing this concept; for him, it is "collective" simply in the sense that it is common to many individuals; cf. social fact.

Scipio Sighele published ‘La Foule Criminele’ one year before Durkheim, in which he describes emergent characteristics of crowds that don’t appear in the individuals that form the crowd. He doesn’t call this collective consciousness, but ‘âme de la foule’ (soul of the crowd). This term returns in Sigmund Freud’s book about mass psychology and essentially overlaps with Durkheims concept of collective consciousness.

Theories of collective consciousness

Durkheim
Durkheim used the term in his books The Division of Labour in Society (1893), The Rules of the Sociological Method (1895), Suicide (1897), and The Elementary Forms of Religious Life (1912). In The Division of Labour, Durkheim argued that in traditional/primitive societies (those based around clan, family or tribal relationships), totemic religion played an important role in uniting members through the creation of a common consciousness (conscience collective in the original French). In societies of this type, the contents of an individual's consciousness are largely shared in common with all other members of their society, creating a mechanical solidarity through mutual likeness.

In Suicide, Durkheim developed the concept of anomie to refer to the social rather than individual causes of suicide. This relates to the concept of collective consciousness, as if there is a lack of integration or solidarity in society then suicide rates will be higher.

Gramsci
Antonio Gramsci states, “A collective consciousness, which is to say a living organism, is formed only after the unification of the multiplicity through friction on the part of the individuals; nor can one say that ‘silence’ is not a multiplicity.” A form of collective consciousness can be formed from Gramsci's conception that the presence of a hegemony can mobilize the collective consciousness of those oppressed by the ruling ideas of society, or the ruling hegemony. Collective consciousness can refer to a multitude of different individual forms of consciousness coalescing into a greater whole. In Gramsci's view, a unified whole is composed of solidarity among its different constituent parts, and therefore, this whole cannot be uniformly the same. The unified whole can embrace different forms of consciousness (or individual experiences of social reality), which coexist to reflect the different experiences of the marginalized peoples in a given society. This agrees with Gramsci's theory of Marxism and class struggle applied to cultural contexts. Cultural Marxism (as distinguished from the right-wing use of the term) embodies the concept of collective consciousness. It incorporates social movements that are based on some sort of collective identity; these identities can include, for instance, gender, sexual orientation, race, and ability, and can be incorporated by collective-based movements into a broader historical material analysis of class struggle.

According to Michelle Filippini, “The nature and workings of collective organisms – not only parties, but also trade unions, associations and intermediate bodies in general – represent a specific sphere of reflection in the Prison Notebooks, particularly in regard to the new relationship between State and society that in Gramsci's view emerged during the age of mass politics.” Collective organisms can express collective consciousness. Whether this form of expression finds itself in the realm of the state or the realm of society is up to the direction that the subjects take in expressing their collective consciousness. In Gramsci's Prison Notebooks, the ongoing conflict between civil society, the bureaucracy, and the state necessitates the emergence of a collective consciousness that can often act as an intermediary between these different realms. The public organizations of protest, such as labor unions and anti-war organizations, are vehicles that can unite multiple types of collective consciousness. Although identity-based movements are necessary for the progress of democracy and can generate collective consciousness, they cannot completely do so without a unifying framework. This is why anti-war and labor movements provide an avenue that has united various social movements under the banner of a multiple collective consciousness. This is also why future social movements need to have an ethos of collective consciousness if they are to succeed in the long-term.

Zukerfield
Zukerfield states that “The different disciplines that have studied knowledge share an understanding of it as a product of human subjects – individual, collective, etc.” Knowledge in a sociological sense is derived from social conditions and social realities. Collective consciousness also reflects social realities, and sociological knowledge can be gained through the adoption of a collective consciousness. Many different disciplines such as philosophy and literature examine collective consciousness from different lenses. These different disciplines reach a similar understanding of a collective consciousness despite their different approaches to the subject. The inherent humanness in the idea of collective consciousness refers to a shared way of thinking among human beings in the pursuit of knowledge.

Collective consciousness can provide an understanding of the relationship between self and society.  As Zukerfeld states, “Even though it impels us, as a first customary gesture, to analyse the subjective (such as individual consciousness) or intersubjective bearers (such as the values of a given society), in other words those which Marxism and sociology examine, now we can approach them in an entirely different light.” “Cognitive materialism” is presented in the work by Zukerfeld as a sort of ‘third way’ between sociological knowledge and Marxism. Cognitive materialism is based on a kind of collective consciousness of the mind. This consciousness can be used, with cognitive materialism as a guiding force, by human beings in order to critically analyze society and social conditions.

Collective consciousness in society
Society is made up of various collective groups, such as the family, community, organizations, regions, nations which as Burns and Egdahl state "can be considered to possess agential capabilities: to think, judge, decide, act, reform; to conceptualize self and others as well as self's actions and interactions; and to reflect.". It is suggested that these different national behaviors vary according to the different collective consciousness between nations. This illustrates that differences in collective consciousness can have practical significance.

According to a theory, the character of collective consciousness depends on the type of mnemonic encoding used within a group (Tsoukalas, 2007). The specific type of encoding used has a predictable influence on the group's behavior and collective ideology. Informal groups, that meet infrequently and spontaneously, have a tendency to represent significant aspects of their community as episodic memories. This usually leads to strong social cohesion and solidarity, an indulgent atmosphere, an exclusive ethos and a restriction of social networks. Formal groups, that have scheduled and anonymous meetings, tend to represent significant aspects of their community as semantic memories which usually leads to weak social cohesion and solidarity, a more moderate atmosphere, an inclusive ethos and an expansion of social networks.

Literary and oral tradition
In a case study of a Serbian folk story, Wolfgang Ernst examines collective consciousness in terms of forms of media, specifically collective oral and literary traditions. "Current discourse analysis drifts away from the 'culturalist turn' of the last two or three decades and its concern with individual and collective memory as an extended target of historical research". There is still a collective consciousness present in terms of the shared appreciation of folk stories and oral traditions. Folk stories enable the subject and the audiences to come together around a common experience and a shared heritage. In the case of the Serbian folk “gusle”, the Serbian people take pride in this musical instrument of epic poetry and oral tradition and play it at social gatherings. Expressions of art and culture are expressions of a collective consciousness or expressions of multiple social realities.

Sporting events
Edmans, Garcia, and Norlia examined national sporting defeats and correlated them with decreases in the value of stocks.  They examined 1,162 football matches in thirty-nine countries and discovered that stock markets of those countries dropped on average forty-nine points after being eliminated from the World Cup, and thirty-one points after being eliminated in other tournaments. Edmans, Garcia, and Norli found similar but smaller effects with international cricket, rugby, ice hockey, and basketball games.

See also 

 Abilene paradox
 Agenda 21
 Anonymous (group)
 Antonio Gramsci
 Borg Collective
 Collective effervescence
 Collective identity
 Collective intelligence
 Collective memory
 Collective unconscious
 Communal reinforcement
 Crowd psychology
 Deep social mind
 Práńa Dharma
 Egregor 
 Global brain
 Global goals
 Group behaviour
 Group mind
 Groupthink
 Higher consciousness
 Human spirit
 Infodemic
 Materialism
 Noogenesis
 Noosphere
 Paradigm
 Paradigm shift
 Peer pressure
 Presence (telepresence)
 Reality tunnel
 Schema (psychology)
 Social justice
 Social representation
 Superorganism
 Unanimism
 United Nations
 Zeitgeist

Notes

References 
Works by Durkheim
 The Division of Labour in Society (1893)
 The Rules of the Sociological Method (1895)
 Suicide (1897)
 The Elementary Forms of Religious Life (1912)

Works by others
 Gad Barzilai, Communities and Law: Politics and Cultures of Legal Identities University of Michigan Press, 2003. 
 
 
 
 
 
 

Sociological terminology
Collective intelligence
Public opinion
Crowd psychology
Émile Durkheim

de:Kollektiv#Kollektivbewusstsein